Guy Holmes may refer to:

 Guy Holmes (footballer) (1905–1967), English footballer
 Guy E. Holmes (1873–1945), American musician and composer
 Guy Holmes (psychologist), clinical psychologist in the UK